The Al-Uwaysiyat is a mosque in Tripoli, Lebanon. It was built in 1461 during the Mamluks period.

History 
The mosque was built in 1461. It was renovated in 1534 during the Ottoman period.

Architecture 
This mosque is known for its large mid-dome and for its cylindrical Ottoman minaret. From the balcony of its minaret, a smaller cylindrical shape starts than ends with a conical head.

Sources

References

Mamluk architecture in Lebanon
Mosques in Tripoli, Lebanon
Religious buildings and structures completed in 1461